German submarine U-1009 was a Type VIIC/41 U-boat of Nazi Germany's Kriegsmarine during World War II.

She was ordered on 23 March 1942, and was laid down on 24 February 1943, at Blohm & Voss, Hamburg, as yard number 209. She was launched on 5 January 1944, and commissioned under the command of Oberleutnant zur See Klaus Hilgendorf on 10 February 1944.

Design
German Type VIIC/41 submarines were preceded by the heavier Type VIIC submarines. U-1009 had a displacement of  when at the surface and  while submerged. She had two shafts and two  propellers.

U-1009 was fitted with five  torpedo tubes (four fitted at the bow and one at the stern), fourteen torpedoes or 26 TMA or TMB Naval mines, one  SK C/35 naval gun, (220 rounds), one  Flak M42 and two  C/30 anti-aircraft guns. The boat had a complement of between forty-four and fifty-two.

Service history
U-1009 participated in two war patrols which resulted in no ships damaged or sunk.

U-1009 had a Schnorchel underwater-breathing apparatus fitted out sometime before November 1944.

On 10 May 1945, U-1009 surrendered at Loch Eriboll, Scotland and was transferred to Lisahally then Loch Ryan. Of the 156 U-boats that eventually surrendered to the Allied forces at the end of the war, U-1009 was one of 116 selected to take part in Operation Deadlight. U-1009 was towed out and sank on 16 December 1945, by naval gunfire.

See also
 Battle of the Atlantic

References

Bibliography

External links

German Type VIIC/41 submarines
U-boats commissioned in 1944
World War II submarines of Germany
1944 ships
Ships built in Hamburg
Maritime incidents in December 1945
World War II shipwrecks in the Atlantic Ocean
Operation Deadlight